Wiggle High5 Pro Cycling was a British professional cycling team based in Belgium, which competed in elite road bicycle racing and track cycling events, such as the UCI Women's Road World Cup. The team closed at the end of 2018.

The team was the idea of the manager and rider Rochelle Gilmore, and was formed with backing from the Bradley Wiggins Foundation and British Cycling. The two main sponsors of the team are Wiggle and High5.

Team history

2013

On 3 March the team achieved its first ever victory when Emily Collins won the Omloop van het Hageland one day race in Belgium. Collins Shelley Olds (Team TIBCO) and Emma Johansson (Orica–AIS) in a final sprint. On 18 May the team earned its first overall General classification win at the Tour of Zhoushan Island in China where Giorgia Bronzini took overall victory from the Hitec Products UCK pairing of Elisa Longo Borghini and Cecilie Gotaas Johnsen by 14 seconds and 1 minute 6 seconds respectively. The team's second overall victory came at the 2013 La Route de France, where Linda Villumsen won stage 7 and in doing so took overall victory from Emma Johansson by 5 minutes 52 seconds. The race will be remembered for the record breaking efforts of Bronzini who won six consecutive stages (1–6) breaking the all-time record for consecutive stage wins in a women's stage racing and meaning that the team won all 7 road stages. The team finished the season fifth in the UCI Rankings (1060 points) and seventh in the Women's World Cup rankings (166 points).

On 23 August 2013 it was announced that reigning Swedish national road race champion, Emilia Fahlin, would be joining the team for the 2014 season. Also joining the team for the 2014 season are Peta Mullens and current Spanish National Time Trial champion, Anna Sanchis. The team have also signed Joanne Tralaggan for the remainder of 2013.

On 24 August 2013 it was announced that Lauren Kitchen would be leaving the team, joining Hitec Products UCK for the 2014 season. Simon Cope left after Wiggle–Honda's inaugural season to direct continental team  in 2014.

2014

The team took a total of 16 wins in 2014.

On 3 July 2014 it was announced that the co-founder of Le Tour Entier, Kathryn Bertine, had been signed by the team to ride La Course by Le Tour de France. On 15 October Jessica Mundy signed with the team with immediate effect On 5 November 2014 the team announced the signing of Rebecca Wiasak for the remainder of 2014.

On 30 September 2014 it was announced that Elisa Longo Borghini would join the team for 2015 with Dani King signing a contract extension. On 7 October the team announced the signing of, two-time Giro Rosa champion, Mara Abbott and Anna Christian for the 2015 season. On 10 October, the team announced  director Egon van Kessel would be taking on the role of the team's DS for 2015. On 13 October 2014 Audrey Cordon and Jolien D'Hoore joined the team and on 22 October Annette Edmondson joined the team. On 25 October 2014 the team announced the signing of current British National Criterium Champion, Eileen Roe with immediate effect and in time to compete in the Australian Criterium season. On 27 October 2014 the team announced the signing of Chloe Hosking on a one-year contract with Emilia Fahlin signing an extension. On 4 November 2014 Anna Sanchis and Amy Roberts signed one-year extensions. On 6 November 2014, Wiggle–Honda announced that Mayuko Hagiwara also extended her contract. On 10 November 2014 Giorgia Bronzini signed a contract extension with the team for 2015. On 4 December 2014 the team announced they had signed Georgia Baker for the remainder of 2014.

On 8 September 2014 it was announced that Laura Trott would leave the team and join Matrix Fitness Pro Cycling and on 9 September 2014 it was reported that Linda Villumsen will leave the team to join the UnitedHealthcare Women's Team for the 2015 season. On 30 September it was reported that Elinor Barker would leave to join Matrix Fitness–Vulpine with Joanna Rowsell leaving for Pearl Izumi Sports Tours International and on 1 October 2014 it was announced that Charlotte Becker would be leaving for Team Hitec Products. On 30 October Beatrice Bartelloni left the team, joining Alé–Cipollini for the 2015 season. On 23 November 2014 Anna-Bianca Schnitzmeier retired. On 16 December 2014 Emily Collins announced she would leave the team via Twitter.

2015

On 2 January Chloe Hosking scored the team's first win of the 2015 season by taking Stage 1 of the Bay Classic Series – this also marked Hoskings first victory since joining the team. Hosking would then go onto the claim the overall win in the race, with Bronzini taking another stage win for the team. The team's next win came at the Omloop van het Hageland where current Belgian national champion and new signing – Jolien D'Hoore claimed her first win and the team's first on European soil. The team would then go onto an enjoy a rich run of results, with D'Hoore winning Boels Rental Ronde van Drenthe, Bronzini claiming Acht van Westerveld, new signing Audrey Cordon winning Cholet Pays de Loire Dames and another new signing Elisa Longo Borghini winning the Tour of Flanders. In April, D'Hoore went on to win the first stage of the Energiewacht Tour.

Less than 24 hours after claiming the 2015 Australian National Road Race championship, the team announced they had re-signed Peta Mullens for the 2015 season.

The team took a total of 35 wins in 2015, more than any other women's cycling team that year. In August 2015, it was announced that Emma Johansson would join the team on a two-year deal for the 2016 season. On 1 September 2015 the team announced that Amy Pieters would be joining them for the 2016 season, followed shortly afterwards by the news that Lucy Garner was signed as well.

2016
Donna Rae-Szalinski replaced Egon van Kessel as directeur sportif at Wiggle High5 mid-season through 2016, Donna coming in from directing Rochelle Gilmore's Australian NRS team High5 Dream Team.

2017
At the end of 2017 the team saw large changes in the team members. Of the fifteen rider roster, three riders retiring Claudia Lichtenberg, Emma Johansson, and Anna Sanchis; and an additional four riders transferring out to other teams Giorgia Bronzini, Jolien D'Hoore, Mayuko Hagiwara, and Amy Roberts, as well as assistant directeur sportif Martin Vestby. Wiggle High5 would sign on eight new riders for 2018; Katie Archibald, Rachele Barbieri, Elinor Barker, Lisa Brennauer, Martina Ritter, Macey Stewart, Kirsten Wild, and Eri Yonamine.

2018
Wiggle High5 started 2018 with the one of the largest UCI Women's rosters, with eight returning riders and eight new signings. In between the end of the Australian summer races in January and the start of the European spring races at the end of February, it was revealed the team had terminated the employment of their head directeur sportif Donna Rae-Szalinski. Leaving the team also was technical director and then incoming DS Alex Greenfield, head mechanic Tim Haverals, and remaining soigneur Laura Weislo. The team brought in Allan Davis who had started working with new UCI Continental men's team Brisbane Continental Cycling Team in 2018, as Wiggle High 5's DS while legal proceedings are underway with Rae-Szalinski. Ahead of taking her first duty at the Tour of Chongming Island at the end of April, the team announced Kim Palmer as incoming assistant directeur sportif; who like former DS Rae-Szalinski had led the now disbanded High5 Dream Team, and various Australian national team squads.

With Cycling Australia pulling support for national development teams that were usually where Amy Gillett Foundation Cycling Scholarship recipients would race with, near the end of April it was announced that Grace Brown was selected as the 2018 scholarship holder and would start racing overseas with Wiggle High5 starting with the mid-May Tour of California.

On 25 July 2018, Rochelle Gilmore announced that the team would not run in 2019 in an announcement video on their YouTube channel.

The first departure of the team was Grace Brown, returning after her Amy Gillett Scholarship period to race domestically with Team Holden Gusto. As the largest UCI Women's team, and with the team shutting down by the end of the year, the first rider announcing their new team for 2019 was Elisa Longo Borghini. Later in August, Hitec Products–Birk Sport announced Lucy Garner would be switching teams from Wiggle High5. Then a week later, WNT–Rotor Pro Cycling announced both Kirsten Wild and Lisa Brennauer would join in 2019 on two year contracts. In early September, FDJ Nouvelle-Aquitaine Futuroscope announced Emilia Fahlin would join the team for 2019.

Team roster

Major wins

2013
Omloop van het Hageland, Emily Collins
Classica Citta di Padova, Giorgia Bronzini
Stage 1 Grand Prix Elsy Jacobs, Giorgia Bronzini
Knokke-Heist – Bredene, Giorgia Bronzini
Stage 2 Tour of Chongming Island, Giorgia Bronzini
Championnat de Wallonie, Mayuko Hagiwara
Moergestel Criterium, Lauren Kitchen
Elveden Estate Cycle Race, Laura Trott
 Overall Tour of Zhoushan Island, Giorgia Bronzini
Stage 1, Giorgia Bronzini
Milk Race, Dani King
Stage 2 Giro d'Italia Femminile, Giorgia Bronzini
 Combativity award Stage 1 Thüringen Rundfahrt der Frauen, Linda Villumsen
 Combativity award Stage 2 Thüringen Rundfahrt der Frauen, Anna-Bianca Schnitzmeier
RideLondon GP, Laura Trott
 Overall La Route de France, Linda Villumsen
Stages 1, 2, 3, 4, 5 & 6, Giorgia Bronzini
Stage 7, Linda Villumsen
 Points classification, Tour Cycliste Féminin International de l'Ardèche, Giorgia Bronzini
 Mountains classification, Linda Villumsen
 Combination classification, Linda Villumsen
Prologue, Linda Villumsen
Stages 1, 3 & 6, Giorgia Bronzini
International Belgian Open (3 km Time Trial), Joanna Rowsell
Stage 1 Giro della Toscana Int. Femminile – Memorial Michela Fanini, Giorgia Bronzini
Revolution series Manchester (Points race), Dani King
UCI Track Cycling World Cup – Manchester (Team Pursuit), Dani King, Joanna Rowsell, Laura Trott & Elinor Barker
UCI Track Cycling World Cup – Manchester (Individual pursuit), Joanna Rowsell
UCI Track Cycling World Cup – Manchester (Omnium), Laura Trott
Copa Internacional de Pista (Scratch Race), Beatrice Bartelloni
Overall NSW Grand Prix, Charlotte Becker
Round 1, Lauren Kitchen
Round 2, Peta Mullens
Stan Siejka Classic, Lauren Kitchen
2014
 Overall Michelton Bay Classic Series, Giorgia Bronzini
 Sprints classification, Peta Mullens
Teams classification
Stages 1, 3 & 4, Giorgia Bronzini
Unley Criterium, Peta Mullens
Grand Prix de Dottignies, Giorgia Bronzini
Wallonia Cup #3 (XCO), Peta Mullens
Memorial Stefano e Diego Trovò, Giorgia Bronzini
Stage 3 Tour of Chongming Island, Giorgia Bronzini
 Overall Tour of Zhoushan Island, Charlotte Becker
 Points classification, Giorgia Bronzini
 Best Asian rider classification, Mayuko Hagiwara
Stage 1, Charlotte Becker
Stage 3, Giorgia Bronzini
Matrix Fitness GP Series – Redditch, Amy Roberts
Hillingdon GP, Amy Roberts
Overall Holme Valley Wheelers 2-day Stage race, Joanna Rowsell
Stages 1 & 3, Laura Trott
 Overall Surf & Turf 2-day Stage race, Laura Trott
Prologue, Stages 1 & 2, Laura Trott
Stage 2 Giro d'Italia Femminile, Giorgia Bronzini
Fenioux Track Championships (Omnium), Laura Trott
Fiorenzuola d'Arda (Points race), Giorgia Bronzini
Commonwealth Games Track Championships (Individual pursuit), Joanna Rowsell
Commonwealth Games Track Championships (Points race), Laura Trott
RideLondon Grand Prix, Giorgia Bronzini
Stage 3 La Route de France, Giorgia Bronzini
Combaitivity award Stage 2, Charlotte Becker
Combaitivity award Stage 5, Charlotte Becker
 Overall Tour Cycliste Féminin International de l'Ardèche, Linda Villumsen
 Points classification, Giorgia Bronzini
Stage 1, 4 & 6, Giorgia Bronzini
Stage 2 (ITT), Linda Villumsen
Caribbean Time Trial Championships, Kathryn Bertine
Revolution Series Omnium (Round 1), Laura Trott
Melbourne Kermesse, Peta Mullens
Gent Track Championships, (Scratch race), Giorgia Bronzini
UCI Track Cycling World Cup – Guadalajara, Laura Trott, Elinor Barker & Amy Roberts
UCI Track Cycling World Cup – London, Laura Trott, Elinor Barker & Joanna Rowsell
2015
 Points classification Women's Tour Down Under, Annette Edmondson
Stage 3, Giorgia Bronzini
Teams classification Ladies Tour of Qatar
Omloop van het Hageland, Jolien D'Hoore
Acht van Westerveld, Giorgia Bronzini
Boels Rental Ronde van Drenthe, Jolien D'Hoore
Cholet Pays de Loire Dames, Audrey Cordon-Ragot
Tour of Flanders, Elisa Longo Borghini
Stage 1 Energiewacht Tour, Jolien D'Hoore
Marianne Vos Classic, Chloe Hosking
Tour of Chongming Island World Cup, Giorgia Bronzini
La Classique Morbihan, Chloe Hosking
Diamond Tour, Jolien D'Hoore
Stage 2 Aviva Women's Tour, Jolien D'Hoore
 Italian rider classification Giro d'Italia Femminile, Elisa Longo Borghini
Stage 6, Mayuko Hagiwara
Stage 9, Mara Abbott
 Overall BeNe Ladies Tour, Jolien D'Hoore
 Points classification, Jolien D'Hoore
Team classification
Stages 1, 2a (ITT) & 2b, Jolien D'Hoore
Stage 3 Tour de Bretagne Féminin, Mayuko Hagiwara
 Overall La Route de France, Elisa Longo Borghini
Stages 2 & 6, Giorgia Bronzini
Stages 3 & 5, Elisa Longo Borghini
Crescent Women World Cup Vårgårda, Jolien D'Hoore
Stages 1 & 2 Holland Ladies Tour, Jolien D'Hoore
2016
Stage 4 Ladies Tour of Qatar, Chloe Hosking
 Mountains classification Women's Tour Down Under, Dani King
Stage 2, Annette Edmondson
Asian Cycling Championships – Time Trial, Mayuko Hagiwara
Dwars door Vlaanderen, Amy Pieters
 Overall Euskal Emakumeen XXIX Bira, Emma Johansson
  Points classification, Emma Johansson
Stages 1 & 2, Emma Johansson
Stage 3, Giorgia Bronzini
 Overall Tour of the Gila, Mara Abbott
 Mountains classification, Mara Abbott
Stages 1 & 5, Mara Abbott
Diamond Tour, Jolien D'Hoore
 Italian rider classification Giro d'Italia Femminile, Elisa Longo Borghini
Stages 1 & 8, Giorgia Bronzini
Stage 3, Chloe Hosking
Stage 5, Mara Abbott
 Overall BeNe Ladies Tour, Jolien D'Hoore
 Points classification, Jolien D'Hoore
Stages 1, 3 & 4 (ITT), Jolien D'Hoore
 Points classification Tour de Feminin-O cenu Českého Švýcarska, Jolien D'Hoore
 Overall La Course by Le Tour de France, Chloe Hosking
 Mountains classification Thüringen Rundfahrt der Frauen, Emma Johansson
Prologue La Route de France, Amy Pieters
Stage 3 La Route de France, Chloe Hosking
Madrid Challenge by La Vuelta, Jolien D'Hoore
2017
Omloop van het Hageland, Jolien D'Hoore
Strade Bianche, Elisa Longo Borghini
Pajot Hills Classic, Annette Edmondson
Grand Prix de Dottignies, Jolien D'Hoore
 Overall Tour of Chongming Island, Jolien D'Hoore
 Mountains classification
Stages 2 & 3, Jolien D'Hoore
Stage 4 Tour of California, Giorgia Bronzini
 Mountains classification The Women's Tour, Audrey Cordon-Ragot
Stage 5, Jolien D'Hoore
 Italian rider classification Giro d'Italia Femminile, Elisa Longo Borghini
Stage 4, Jolien D'Hoore
Prologue BeNe Ladies Tour, Annette Edmondson
Stage 1 Ladies Tour of Norway, Jolien D'Hoore
Prologue & Stage 2 Belgium Tour, Jolien D'Hoore
 Bretagne Regional Time Trial Championships, Audrey Cordon-Ragot
Chrono des Nations, Audrey Cordon-Ragot
2018
Stage 1 Women's Tour Down Under, Annette Edmondson
Towards Zero Race Melbourne, Annette Edmondson
 Points classification Healthy Ageing Tour, Kirsten Wild
Stage 3a, Kirsten Wild
Commonwealth Games
 Team Pursuit, Amy Cure and Annette Edmondson
 Scratch Race, Amy Cure
 Individual Pursuit, Katie Archibald
 Points Race, Elinor Barker
 Mountains classification Tour of Chongming Island, Lucy Garner
Stage 3, Kirsten Wild
 Points classification Women's Tour de Yorkshire
Stage 1, Kirsten Wild
 Overall Thüringen Rundfahrt der Frauen, Lisa Brennauer
 German rider classification  Thüringen Rundfahrt der Frauen, Lisa Brennauer
Stage 4 Thüringen Rundfahrt der Frauen, Lisa Brennauer
 Mountains classification The Women's Tour, Elisa Longo Borghini
 Italian rider classification Giro Rosa, Elisa Longo Borghini
Stage 2 Giro Rosa, Kirsten Wild
Team classification BeNe Ladies Tour
Prologue, Katie Archibald
RideLondon Classique, Kirsten Wild
 Points classification Giro delle Marche in Rosa, Rachele Barbieri
Stage 2, Elisa Longo Borghini

Team Ranking

National, continental and world champions

2013
 Australian U23 Criterium, Lauren Kitchen
 World Track (Team Pursuit), Dani King
 World Track (Team Pursuit), Joanna Rowsell
 World Track (Team Pursuit), Laura Trott
 British Time Trial, Joanna Rowsell
 British U23 Road Race, Laura Trott
 British Track (Individual Pursuit ), Laura Trott
 British Track (Points Race), Laura Trott
 British Track (Madison), Laura Trott
 British Track (Team Pursuit), Elinor Barker
 British Track (Team Pursuit), Dani King
 British Track (Team Pursuit), Joanna Rowsell
 British Track (Team Pursuit), Laura Trott
 European Track (Team Pursuit), Elinor Barker
 European Track (Team Pursuit), Dani King
 European Track (Team Pursuit), Joanna Rowsell
 European Track (Team Pursuit), Laura Trott
 European Track (Omnium), Laura Trott
 Italian Track (Keirin), Giorgia Bronzini
 Italian Track (Team Pursuit), Beatrice Bartelloni
 New Zealand Criterium, Emily Collins
2014
 World Track (Team Pursuit), Elinor Barker
 World Track (Team Pursuit), Joanna Rowsell
 World Track (Team Pursuit), Laura Trott
 Australian XCE, Peta Mullens
 Japanese Time Trial, Mayuko Hagiwara
 Japanese Road, Mayuko Hagiwara
 British Road, Laura Trott
 British U23 Road, Laura Trott
 British Track (Team Pursuit), Elinor Barker
 British Track (Team Pursuit), Dani King
 British Track (Team Pursuit), Joanna Rowsell
 British Track (Team Pursuit), Laura Trott
 British Track (Scratch Race), Laura Trott
 Italian Track (Team Pursuit), Beatrice Bartelloni
 European Track (Team pursuit), Laura Trott
 European Track (Team pursuit), Elinor Barker
 European Track (Team pursuit), Joanna Rowsell
 European Track (Omnium), Laura Trott
2015
 Australian Track (Madison), Jessica Mundy
 Australian Track (Madison), Annette Edmondson
 Oceania Track (Omnium),, Annette Edmondson
 Belgian Track (Omnium), Jolien D'Hoore
 World Track (Team pursuit), Annette Edmondson
 World Track (Individual pursuit), Rebecca Wiasak
 World Track (Omnium), Annette Edmondson
 French Time Trial, Audrey Cordon
 Spanish Time Trial, Anna Sanchis
 Spanish Road, Anna Sanchis
 Japanese Road, Mayuko Hagiwara
 Belgian Road, Jolien D'Hoore
2016
 Belgian Track (500m), Jolien D'Hoore
 Belgian Track (Scratch race), Jolien D'Hoore
 Belgian Track (Points race), Jolien D'Hoore
 Belgian Track (Individual pursuit), Jolien D'Hoore
 Asian Cycling Championships (ITT), Mayuko Hagiwara
 Australian Track (Points race), Annette Edmondson
 Australian Track (Scratch race), Annette Edmondson
 Italian Time Trial, Elisa Longo Borghini
 Sweden Time Trial, Emma Johansson
 French Time Trial, Audrey Cordon
 Spanish Time Trial, Anna Sanchis
 European Track (Madison), Jolien D'Hoore
2017
 Oceania Track (Team pursuit), Annette Edmondson
 Oceania Track (Team pursuit), Amy Cure
 Oceania Track (Madison), Amy Cure
 Oceania Track (Madison), Annette Edmondson
 Oceania Track (Omnium), Amy Cure
 Australian Track (Points race), Amy Cure
 Australian Track (Scratch race), Amy Cure
 French Time Trial, Audrey Cordon
 Italian Road Race, Elisa Longo Borghini
 Italian Time Trial, Elisa Longo Borghini
 Belgian Road, Jolien D'Hoore
 Denmark Track (Points race), Julie Leth
2018
 British Track (Individual pursuit), Katie Archibald
 British Track (Scratch race), Katie Archibald
 British Track (Points race), Katie Archibald
 Australian Track (Team pursuit), Annette Edmondson
 Australian Track (Points race), Amy Cure
 Australian Track (Scratch race), Amy Cure
 World Track (Scratch race), Kirsten Wild
 World Track (Omnium), Kirsten Wild
 World Track (Madison), Katie Archibald
 World Track (Points race), Kirsten Wild
 Japanese Time Trial, Eri Yonamine
 Austrian Time Trial, Martina Ritter
 French Time Trial, Audrey Cordon
 German Time Trial, Lisa Brennauer
 Japanese Road Race, Eri Yonamine
 Swedish Road Race, Emilia Fahlin
 German Track (Individual pursuit), Lisa Brennauer
 European Track (Individual pursuit), Lisa Brennauer
 European Track (Scratch race), Kirsten Wild
 European Track (Team pursuit), Katie Archibald
 European Track (Team pursuit), Elinor Barker,
 European Track (Madison), Julie Leth
 Italian Track (Omnium), Rachele Barbieri
 Dutch Track (Points race), Kirsten Wild

References

External links

UCI Women's Teams
Cycling teams based in the United Kingdom
Cycling teams established in 2013
Wiggle Honda